The 1976 Virginia Slims of Chicago  was a women's tennis tournament played on indoor carpet courts at the International Amphitheatre  in Chicago, Illinois in the United States that was part of the 1976 Virginia Slims World Championship Series. It was the fifth edition of the tournament and was held from January 26 through January 31, 1976. Third-seeded Evonne Goolagong Cawley won the singles title and earned $15,000 first-prize money.

Finals

Singles
 Evonne Goolagong Cawley defeated  Virginia Wade 3–6, 6–4, 6–2
 It was Goolagong's 1st singles title of the year and the 63rd of her career.

Doubles
 Olga Morozova /  Virginia Wade defeated  Evonne Goolagong Cawley /  Martina Navratilova 6–7(4–5), 6–4, 6–4

Prize money

References

External links
 Women's Tennis Association (WTA) tournament details

Virginia Slims of Chicago
Virginia Slims of Chicago
Carpet court tennis tournaments
Virginia Slims of Chicago
Virginia Slims of Chicago